Doveyreh (also known as Dowbeyreh) is a village in Howmeh Rural District of the Central District of Bushehr County, Bushehr province, Iran. At the 2006 census, its population was 3,549 in 791 households. The following census in 2011 counted 4,081 people in 1,054 households. The latest census in 2016 showed a population of 4,096 people in 1,147 households; it was the largest village in its rural district.

References 

Populated places in Bushehr County